Ashes and Bones: An Emma Fielding Mystery is a book written by Dana Cameron and published by Avon Books (owned by HarperCollins) on 25 July 2006, which later went on to win the Anthony Award for Best Paperback Original in 2007. It is the 6th one in the series.

Plot 
Emma Fielding confronts a man who should be dead.Tony Markham took the gold artifacts and sailed off into a hurricane. Everyone believes that he is dead, but he is haunting Emma's waking hours. Just when Emma has everything she has worked for all of her adult life a nightmare become real turning her hard won achievements into ashes. No one will believe her until things start getting rough. Plenty of tension building, but it borders on hysteria.

References 

Anthony Award-winning works
American mystery novels
American thriller novels
2006 American novels
Avon (publisher) books